Count Pyotr Andreyevich Tolstoy (1645–1729) was a Russian statesman and diplomat, prominent during and after the reign of Peter the Great. He was the ancestor of all the Counts Tolstoy, including the novelist Leo Tolstoy (September 9 [O.S. August 28], 1828 – November 20 [O.S. November 7], 1910) and Alexei Tolstoy the writer. His wife was Solomonida Timofeevna Dubrovskaya born 1660 and died 1722; he had two sons with her, Ivan (born 1685) and Peter (born 1680). Both his sons died in exile with him the year before his own death. He was, however, survived by many grandchildren: the family was recalled by the Empress Elizabeth, daughter of Peter the Great in 1760, and had all honors and land restored.

Background
Some historians assume Pyotr Tolstoy to have been an "okolnichy", while others consider he came from a "boyar" background.  He served in 1682 as Chamberlain at the court of childless Tsar Feodor III Alekseevich, Tsar 1676–1682. On account of his family relationship with the Miloslavsky family, he miscalculated the strength of the tsarevna Sophia Alekseyevna, (September 17 [N.S. September 27], 1657 – regent of Russia (1682–1689) – July 3 [N.S. July 14], 1704), full  sister of Feodor III and third daughter, also,  of Tsar Alexei I of Russia by his first wife, Maria Miloslavskaya and became one of her most energetic supporters, but contrived to join the other, and winning, side just before the final catastrophe.

Peter was the only son of Tsar Alexei I of Russia's second marriage (to Nataliya Kyrillovna Naryshkina), and therefore, was the younger half-brother of childless Tsar Feodor III and of Sophia, temporary regent of Russia.  For a long time Peter kept his latest supporter at arm's length.  However, in 1697, Tolstoy volunteered to go to Venice to learn Italian and ship-building, and Peter could not resist the subtle flattery implied in such a proposal from a middle-aged Muscovite noble.

Career
In November 1701, Tolstoy was appointed the first regularly accredited Russian ambassador to the Ottoman Empire, known as The  Sublime Porte, and in this demanding role, he more than justified the confidence of the most exacting of masters. Even before Poltava, Tolstoy had the greatest difficulty in preventing the Turks from aiding the Swedes.  
When Charles XII took refuge on Turkish soil, Tolstoy instantly demanded his extradition. 
This diplomatic blunder only irritated the already alarmed Turks, and on 10 October 1710, Tolstoy was thrown into the Seven Towers, a proceeding tantamount to a declaration of war against Russia. 
On his release, in 1714, he returned to Russia, was created a senator, and closely associated himself with the omnipotent favourite, Aleksandr Menshikov.

In 1717, his position during Peter's reign was secured once and for all by his successful mission to Naples to bring back the unfortunate tsarevich Alexei Petrovich, (28 February 1690 – by death penalty authorised by one hundred twenty six members of the equivalent of the Russian Duma following the wishes of his father, 7 July 1718, aged twenty-eight), the son of Tsar Peter I whom he may be said to have literally hunted to death.

For this, Tolstoy earned the undying hatred of the majority of the Russian people; but Tsar Peter I naturally regarded it as an inestimable service and loaded Tolstoy with honours and riches, appointing him, moreover, the head of the Secret Chancellery, or official torture chamber, a post for which Tolstoy, nearly eighty years old by then, was by nature eminently fitted, as his vigorous prosecution of the Mons Affair (1724) made clear.

He materially assisted Aleksandr Menshikov to raise the empress consort, to become Catherine I, (deceased less than two years later in 1727), to the throne on the decease of Peter in 1725, and the new sovereign made him a count and one of the six members of the newly instituted Supreme Privy Council (Верховный тайный совет).

Tolstoy was well aware that the elevation of the grand duke Peter II, son of the tsarevich Alexei, grandson of Piotr I would put an end to his own career and endanger his whole family.

Tsar Peter II Alexeyvich, here above, was the son of tsarevich Alexei Petrovich "Romanov", executed at age twenty-eight, the widower at twenty-five of German Princess Charlotte Christine, sister in law of Emperor Charles VI of Austria. Peter II, grandson of Peter I of Russia, was Tsar of Russia aged twelve, for three years, and died aged fifteen. 

Therefore, when Menshikov, during the last days of Catherine I, declared in favour of Peter, Tolstoy endeavoured to form a party of his own whose object it was to promote the accession of Catherine's second daughter, the tsarevna Elizabeth. But Menshikov was too strong and too quick for his ancient colleague. On the very day of Empress Catherine I's death (11 May 1727), Tolstoy, now in his eighty-second year, was banished to the Solovetsky Monastery in the White Sea, where he died two years later.

Pyotr Tolstoy is the author of a sketch of the impressions made upon him by Western Europe during his tour in the years 1697–1698 and also of a detailed description of the Black Sea.

Descendants
Not all the later family lineages of nobility bearing the last name of Tolstoy list Pyotr Andreyevich as their ancestor. However, it is among his direct descendants in the male line where we find all the known Tolstoy writers, among them Leo Tolstoy, Aleksey Konstantinovich Tolstoy, and Aleksey Nikolayevich Tolstoy (the former and the latter having notable descendants as well). There were a number of statesmen and soldiers descending from Pyotr Andreyevich, as Education and Interior Minister Dmitry Tolstoy.

His other notable descendants were such literati as the pioneering Russian philosopher Pyotr Chaadayev and Vladimir Odoyevsky.

Notes

References
 
 Tolstoi, P., The Travel Diary of Peter Tolstoi: A Muscovite in Early Modern Europe. Translated by Max.J. Okenfuss. De Kalb, (1987). Hardcover, Northern Illinois University Press,  (0-87580-130-7).
 The Rise and Fall of Latin Humanism in Early-Modern Russia: Pagan Authors, Ukrainians, and the Resiliency of Muscovy,  by Max J. Okenfuss,  Hardcover, Brill Academic Publishers,  (90-04-10331-7). Leiden, (Holland),  (1995).
 Isabel de Madariaga. Politics and Culture in Eighteenth-Century Russia: Collected Essays. London and New York: Longman, (1998). viii + 304 pp. ; .

Further reading 
 Mazon, A., „Pierre Tolstoi et Pierre le Grand", in Analecta Slavica, Amsterdam, 1955, pp. 19–55

Counts of the Russian Empire
Pyotr Andreyevich
Politicians of the Russian Empire
Secret service personnel of the Russian Empire
1645 births
1729 deaths
Diplomats of the Russian Empire
Ambassadors of the Russian Empire to the Ottoman Empire
17th-century Russian people
18th-century diplomats of the Russian Empire
Members of the Supreme Privy Council
Recipients of the Order of the White Eagle (Poland)